The Cleveland mayoral election of 1961 saw the fourth re-election of incumbent mayor Anthony J. Celebrezze. His Republican opponent was Albina Cermak, the first woman to run for mayor of Cleveland.

General election

References

Mayoral elections in Cleveland
Cleveland mayoral
Cleveland
November 1961 events in the United States
1960s in Cleveland